Saints Felix and Constanza were a brother and sister from the Roman city of Nuceria Alfaterna, and were martyred by the emperor Nero in 68 AD (September 19, tradition says).

References

68 deaths
1st-century Christian martyrs
Year of birth unknown